Mowaffak Allaf (1927–1996) was a Syrian diplomat, and a former ambassador to the United Nations. Allaf served as the Under-Secretary-General of the UN in Geneva, and headed the Syrian delegation to the Madrid peace conference and the subsequent peace talks with Israel.

Allaf held a diploma in international relations from the University of Damascus, and was awarded the "Decoration for Services to the Republic of Austria in Gold with Sash" by Austrian President Kurt Waldheim in February 1987.

References

1927 births
1996 deaths
Permanent Representatives of Syria to the United Nations
Damascus University alumni
People from Damascus
Recipients of the Grand Decoration with Sash for Services to the Republic of Austria